Pseuderanthemum crenulatum is a herbaceous plant species, belonging to the Acanthaceae, which occurs in Indo-China and Malaysia; no subspecies are listed in the Catalogue of Life.

Gallery

References

crenulatum
Flora of Indo-China
Lamiales of Asia